The North Eastern Football League is an Australian rules football competition based in the Mid North region of South Australia, Australia.  It is an affiliated member of the South Australian National Football League. 8 teams are in the league. The most recent team to join the comp is the Southern Saints (Eudunda/Robertstown) who joined in 2010. Except the Eudunda Rosters were an original team in the NEFL. Only in 2010 Robertstown "Roos" joined in with the NEFL.

Current clubs

Brief history 
The North Eastern Football League was formed in 1946.  The founding clubs included Booborowie, Burra, Hallett, Leighton and Spalding.

Later on clubs included Clare Football Club (was split into North and South Clare in 1950), Stanley Flat Football Club, Brinkworth / Yacka Football Club, Gulnare / Redhill Football Club).

Prior to the 2010 Season, after much speculation, the Eudunda Football Club merged with the Robertstown Football Club from the recently defunct Mid Murray Football Association to become the Southern Saints. So far, the merger has not been as promising as expected, with the senior side winless in 2010.

Premierships

	1946	Booborowie
	1947	Spalding
	1948	Hallett
	1949	Hallett
	1950	Hallett
	1951	Hallett
	1952	Terowie
	1953	Booborowie
	1954	Booborowie
	1955	Hallett
	1956	Burra
	1957	Hallett
	1958	Booborowie
	1959	Booborowie
	1960	Burra
	1961	Booborowie
	1962	Booborowie
	1963	Booborowie
	1964	Booborowie
	1965	Booborowie
	1966	Booborowie
	1967	Booborowie
	1968	Burra
	1969	Booborowie
	1970	Burra
	1971	South Clare
	1972	South Clare
	1973	South Clare
	1974	Blyth
	1975	Burra
	1976	Burra
	1977	Mintaro/Manoora
	1978	Mintaro/Manoora
	1979	Mintaro/Manoora
	1980	North Clare
	1981	North Clare
	1982	North Clare
	1983	South Clare
	1984	Blyth
	1985	BYS
	1986	South Clare
	1987	Blyth
	1988	BSR
	1989	BSR
	1990	BSR
	1991	North Clare
	1992	North Clare
	1993	BSR
	1994	North Clare
	1995	North Clare
	1996	South Clare
	1997	North Clare
	1998	RSMU
	1999	BSR
	2000	BSR
	2001	RSMU
	2002	South Clare
	2003	RSMU
	2004	Mintaro/Manoora
	2005	South Clare
	2006	Blyth/Snowtown
	2007	Blyth/Snowtown
	2008	Mintaro/Manoora
	2009	Burra-Booborowie-Hallett
	2010	Blyth/Snowtown
	2011	Burra-Booborowie-Hallett
	2012	Mintaro/Manoora
	2013	Blyth/Snowtown
	2014	RSMU
	2015    RSMU
	2016	RSMU
	2017	BSR
	2018	BSR
   2019    Blyth/Snowtown
   2020    BSR
   2021    BSR

2006 Ladder

2007 Ladder

2008 Ladder

2009 Ladder

2010 Ladder

2011 Ladder

2012 Ladder

2013 Ladder

2014 Ladder

2015 Ladder

2016 Ladder

2017 Ladder

See also
 Stanley Football Association
 Albert Fryar

References

External links 
 Footypedia - NEFL
 country footy

Books
 Encyclopedia of South Australian country football clubs / compiled by Peter Lines. 
 South Australian country football digest / by Peter Lines 

Australian rules football competitions in South Australia